The 2012 IIHF U18 World Championship Division I was a pair of international under-18 ice hockey tournaments organised by the International Ice Hockey Federation. In 2012 a new format was introduced to the IIHF World U18 Championships, therefore Division I A and Division I B represented the second and the third tier of the IIHF World U18 Championships.

Division I A
The Division I A tournament was played in Piešťany, Slovakia, from 11 to 17 April 2012.

Participants

Final standings

Results
All times are local. (Central European Summer Time – UTC+2)

Division I B
The Division I B tournament was played in Székesfehérvár, Hungary, from 11 to 17 April 2012.

Participants

Final standings

Results
All times are local. (Central European Summer Time – UTC+2)

References

2012 IIHF World U18 Championships
IIHF World U18 Championship Division I
International ice hockey competitions hosted by Slovakia
International ice hockey competitions hosted by Hungary
2012
IIHF